Michael James MacKenzie Mayer (born 16 April 1977) is a former professional rugby union player who played centre at Bristol, Leeds and representing Scotland.

Early life
Jamie Mayer was born in Edinburgh, Scotland. He was educated at Merchiston Castle School, George Watson's College and played for Scottish schools. He studied at Napier University.

Club career
He established himself at centre for Edinburgh Reivers. Mayer moved to Leeds from Bristol in 2001, he stayed for one season and scored six tries in the 12 games that he played. Mayer made his debut against Bath and scored his first try against Pontypridd. A strong runner and powerful defender he was hoping to establish himself and Leeds in the top flight and also regain his position in the Scottish international ranks. Mayer's first season ended unhappily with him sustaining a severe hamstring injury just as he was beginning to cement a starting spot in the team and running into some form and a few tries. He struggled with fitness and suffered with injuries leading him to give up professional rugby where upon he returned to Watsonians to see out the remainder of his playing years.

International career
Mayer won 8 caps between 1998 and 2000.

After rugby
After his rugby career had ended early due to injury, he worked as an investment management consultant in Edinburgh.He has 4children. Twins Mollie and Max were born in 2004 and second set of twins Charlie and Jack were born in 2005.

References

External links
Jamie Mayer on Sporting Heroes

1977 births
Living people
Scottish rugby union players
People educated at Merchiston Castle School
People educated at George Watson's College
Rugby union players from Edinburgh
Alumni of Edinburgh Napier University
Scotland international rugby union players
Rugby union centres